Swarup may refer to:

Shanti Swarup Bhatnagar (1894–1955), Indian scientist
Swarup Kishan (1930–1992), Indian Test cricket umpire
Gopal Swarup Pathak (1896–1982), the fourth Vice President of India (1969–1974)
Raghunandan Swarup Pathak (1924–2007), the 18th Chief Justice of India
Swarup Singh (disambiguation), several people
Anand Swarup (died 1937), guru from the Dayal Bagh branch of the Radha Soami tradition
Anoop Swarup (born 1959), academic, social activist, ecologist, peace exponent
Dhirendra Swarup, nominated as FPSBI chairman
Govind Swarup, radio astronomer
Ram Swarup (1920–1998), independent Hindu thinker and prolific author
Shri Mohan Swarup (born 1918), Member of Parliament for several terms
Vikas Swarup Indian novelist and diplomat
Virendra Swarup, member and chairman of the Legislative Council of Uttar Pradesh, India

Indian surnames